Abracadabrella lewiston is a species of jumping spider in the genus Abracadabrella. The scientific name of this species was first published in 1991 by Marek Żabka. These spiders are usually easily found in South Australia.

References
 : The world spider catalog, version 10.5.  American Museum of Natural History .

Salticidae
Fauna of South Australia
Spiders of Australia
Spiders described in 1991